Jack Thomas Brownell (born 3 August 1999) is an English professional footballer who plays as a midfielder for Spalding United.

Career
Brownell joined Chesterfield at U16 level and signed a professional contract with the club in April 2017. His contract was not renewed by Chesterfield at the end of the 2017–18 season.

Brownell joined Spalding United in September 2018.

Career statistics

References

1999 births
Living people
Footballers from Sheffield
English footballers
Association football midfielders
Chesterfield F.C. players
English Football League players